Htilin Township (also spelt as Tilin) is a township of Pakokku District in the Magway Region of Burma (Myanmar).  The principal town and administrative seat is Htilin.

Communities
Among the towns and villages in Htilin Township are Akyiban, Inna, Kantha, Kyaing, Kyaw, Letpan, Mawle, Ngabyin, Sobya, Talin, Thanle, Ti, Wetthet, Nyaunggan, Zeetaw, Ainema, and Shwegontine.Butaung,

Notes

External links
 Township 118 on "Myanmar States/Divisions & Townships Overview Map" Myanmar Information Management Unit (MIMU)
 "Htilin Google Satellite Map" Maplandia

Townships of Magway Region